Nathan Gordon (born 12 February 1990) is a former professional Australian rules footballer who played with the Sydney Swans and Richmond Football Club in the Australian Football League (AFL). He was delisted by the Swans at the end of the 2012 season.

After a strong season with North Adelaide in the South Australian National Football League (SANFL), Gordon was drafted by Richmond with pick No. 50 in the 2013 AFL Draft.

He was delisted by Richmond in October 2015.

References

External links

1990 births
Living people
Sydney Swans players
Richmond Football Club players
Australian rules footballers from New South Wales
East Coast Eagles players
North Adelaide Football Club players
Tiwi Bombers Football Club players
NSW/ACT Rams players